Lainhart is a surname. Notable people with the surname include:

Porter Lainhart (1907–1991), American football player
Richard Lainhart (1953–2011), American composer

See also
Lainhart Farm Complex and Dutch Barn, farm complex in Altamont, New York
Linhart